Leptodexia is a genus of parasitic flies in the family Tachinidae.

Species
Leptodexia gracilis Townsend, 1919
Leptodexia pretiosa (Curran, 1934)

References

Dexiinae
Diptera of South America
Diptera of North America
Tachinidae genera
Taxa named by Charles Henry Tyler Townsend